Lohri is a popular winter Punjabi folk festival celebrated primarily in Northern India. The significance and legends about the Lohri festival are many and these link the festival to the Punjab region. It is believed by many that the festival marks the passing of the winter solstice. Lohri marks the end of winter, and is a traditional welcome of longer days and the sun's journey to the northern hemisphere by people in the northern region of the Indian subcontinent. It is observed the night before Maghi, according to the solar part of the lunisolar Punjabi calendar, and almost always falls on 13 January.

Lohri is an official holiday in Punjab, Jammu and Himachal Pradesh. The festival is celebrated in Delhi and Haryana but is not a gazetted holiday. In all these areas, the festival is celebrated by Sikhs, Hindus and whoever wants to enjoy. In Punjab, Pakistan it is not observed at official level; however, Sikhs, Hindus and some Muslims observe the festival in rural Punjab and in the cities of Faisalabad and Lahore. Muhammad Tariq, former director of Faisalabad Arts Council, believes it is important to keep the festival alive as Lohri is celebrated in Pakistan Punjab and in Indian Punjab.

Date
Lohri is linked to the Punjabi calendar, and is celebrated the day before the festival of Maghi. Lohri falls in the month of Poh and is set by the solar part of the lunisolar Punjabi calendar and in most years it falls around 13 January of the Gregorian calendar.

History & origins

Lohri is mentioned by European visitors to the Lahore darbar of Maharaja Ranjit Singh, such as Wade who visited the Maharaja in 1832. Captain Mackeson described Maharaja Ranjit Singh distributing suits of clothes and large sums of money as rewards on Lohri day in 1836. The celebration of Lohri with the making of a huge bonfire at night is also noted in the royal court in 1844.
 
The accounts of Lohri celebration in royal circles do not discuss the origins of the festival. However, there is much folklore about Lohri. Lohri is the celebration of the arrival of longer days after the winter solstice. According to folklore, in ancient times Lohri was celebrated at the end of the traditional month when winter solstice occurs. It celebrates the days getting longer as the sun proceeds on its northward journey. The day after Lohri is celebrated as Makar Sankranti.

Lohri is an ancient mid-winter festival originating in regions near the Himalayan mountains where winter is colder than the rest of the subcontinent. Hindus and Sikhs traditionally lit bonfires in their yards after the weeks of the Rabi season cropping work, socialized around the fire, sang and danced together as they marked the end of winter and the onset of longer days. 

However, instead of celebrating Lohri on the eve of when winter solstice actually occurs, Punjabis celebrate it on the last day of the month during which winter solstice takes place. Lohri commemorates the passing of the winter solstice.

Significance
The ancient significance of the festival is it being a winter crop season celebration and is linked to the Punjab region. A popular folklore links Lohri to the tale of Dulla Bhatti. The central theme of many Lohri songs is the legend of Dulla Bhatti (Rai Abdullah Bhatti) whose father was a zamindar who lived in Punjab during the reign of Mughal Emperor Akbar. He was regarded as a hero in Punjab, for rescuing Punjabi girls from being forcibly taken to be sold in slave market of the Middle East. Amongst those he saved were two girls Sundri and Mundri, who gradually became a theme of Punjab's folklore. As a part of Lohri celebrations, children go around homes singing the traditional folk songs of Lohri with "Dulla Bhatti" name included. One person sings, while others end each line with a loud "Ho!" sung in unison. After the song ends, the adult of the home is expected to give snacks and money to the singing troupe of youngsters. Lohri also marks the beginning of the harvest season and sunny days.

Celebrations
The festival is celebrated by lighting bonfires, eating festive food, dancing and collecting gifts. In houses that have recently had a marriage or childbirth, Lohri celebrations will reach a higher pitch of excitement. Most North Indians usually have private Lohri celebrations, in their houses. Lohri rituals are performed, with the accompaniment of special Lohri songs.

Singing and dancing form an intrinsic part of the celebrations. People wear their brightest clothes and come to dance the bhangra and gidda to the beat of the dhol. Punjabi songs are sung, and everybody rejoices. Sarson da saag and makki di roti is usually served as the main course at a Lohri dinner. Lohri is a great occasion that holds great importance for farmers. However, people residing in urban areas also celebrate Lohri, as this festival provides the opportunity to interact with family and friends.

Bonfire and festive foods
Lohri is celebrated with a bonfire. The lighting of bonfire during this winter festival is an ancient tradition. Ancient people lit the bonfire to reignite the return of longer days. This is a very ancient tradition.

In Punjab the harvest festival Lohri is marked by eating sheaves of roasted corn from the new harvest. The January sugarcane harvest is celebrated in the Lohri festival. Sugarcane products such as gurh and gachak are central to Lohri celebrations, as are nuts which are harvested in January. The other important food item of Lohri is radish which can be harvested between October and January. Mustard greens are cultivated mainly in the winter months because the crop is suitable to the agro-climatic conditions. Accordingly, mustard greens are also a winter produce. It is traditional to eat Gajak, Sarson da saag with Makki di roti, radish, ground nuts and jaggery. It is also traditional to eat til rice, which is made by mixing jaggery, sesame seeds and puffed rice. In some places, this dish, more like a snack, is named tilcholi.

Chajja dance and Hiran dance
Lohri in Jammu is special because of various additional traditions associated with it like Chajja-making and dancing, Hiran dance, preparing Lohri garlands. Young children prepare a replica of peacock which is known as Chajja. They carry this Chajja and then go from one house to other house celebrating Lohri. In and around Jammu, special Hiran dance is performed. Selected houses which have auspicious ceremonies prepare eatables. Children wear special garlands made of groundnuts, dry fruits and candies on Lohri day.

Collecting Lohri items and trick–or–treating
In various places of the Punjab, about 10 to 15 days before Lohri, groups of young and teenage boys and girls go around the neighbourhood collecting logs for the Lohri bonfire. In some places, they also collect items such as grains and jaggery which are sold and the sale proceeds are divided amongst the group.

In some parts of Punjab, there is a popular trick–or–treat activity which is engaged in by boys to select a group member to smear his face with ash and tie a rope around his waist. The idea is for the selected person to act as a deterrent for people who refrain from giving Lohri items. The boys will sing Lohri songs asking for Lohri items. If not enough is given, the householder will be given an ultimatum to either give more or the rope will be loosened. If not enough is given, then the boy who has his face smeared will try to enter the house and smash clay pots or the clay stove.

Practices
During the day, children go from door to door singing songs and are given sweets and savories, and occasionally, money. Turning them back empty-handed is regarded inauspicious. Where families are welcoming newly-weds and new borns, the requests for treats increases.

The collections gathered by the children are known as Lohri and consist of til, gachchak, crystal sugar, gur (jaggery), moongphali (peanuts) and phuliya or popcorn. Lohri is then distributed at night during the festival. Till, peanuts, popcorn and other food items are also thrown into the fire. For some, throwing food into the fire represents the burning of the old year and start the next year on Makar Sankranti.

The bonfire is lit at sunset in the main village square. People toss sesame seeds, gur, sugar-candy and rewaries on the bonfire, sit around it, sing and dance till the fire dies out. Some people perform a prayer and go around the fire. This is to show respect to the natural element of fire, a tradition common in winter solstice celebrations. It is traditional to offer guests til, gachchak, gur, moongphali (peanuts) and phuliya or popcorn. Milk and water are also poured around the bonfire by Hindus to thank the Sun God and seeking his continued protection.

Among some sections of the Sindhi community, the festival is traditionally celebrated as Lal Loi. On the day of Lal Loee children bring wood sticks from their grandparents and aunties and light a fire burning the sticks in the night with people enjoying, dancing and playing around the fire. The festival is gaining popularity amongst other Sindhis where Lohri is not a traditional festival.

Lohri and the financial year
Historically, during the 19th century, revenue for winter crops was collected either on Lohri or Maghi.

Celebration area

Lohri is celebrated to denote the last of the coldest days of winter. The festival is celebrated in Delhi, Punjab, Haryana, Himachal Pradesh, and the Jammu region of Jammu and Kashmir since Mughal times. The festival is observed as Lal Loi in the Sindhi community.

Lohri songs

There are many Lohri songs. For example, the following song which has words to express gratitude to Dulla Bhatti (the 'ho's are in chorus):

Sunder mundriye ho!
Tera kaun vicharaa ho!
Dullah Bhatti walla ho!
Dullhe di dhee vyayae ho!
Ser shakkar payee ho!
Kudi da laal pathaka ho!
Kudi da saalu paata ho!
Salu kaun samete!
Chacha gali dese!
Chache choori kutti! zamidara lutti!
Zamindaar sudhaye!
Bum Bum bhole aaye!
Ek bhola reh gaya!
Sipahee far ke lai gaya!
Sipahee ne mari itt!
Paanvey ro te paanvey pitt!
Sanoo de de Lohri, te teri jeeve jodi!
(Laugh, cry or howl!)

Translation

Beautiful girl
Who will think about you
Dulla of the Bhatti clan will
Dulla's daughter got married
He gave one ser of sugar!
The girl is wearing a red suit!
But her shawl is torn!
Who will stitch her shawl?!
The uncle made choori!
The landlords looted it!
Landlords are beaten up!
Lots of simple-headed boys came!
One simpleton got left behind!
The soldier arrested him!
The soldier hit him with a brick!
(Cry or howl)!
Give us Lohri, long live your pair (to a married couple)!
Whether you cry, or bang your head later! 

Another Lohri song is "Tode upper Toda, Tode upper Saag" which the children sings at the time when they went to seek Lohri from the neighbours. The folk song is sung in Jammu.
Toda!

Tode upar saag.

Saag!

Saag wich mirch!

Mirch!

Mirch lgi kodi.

Kodi!

Deyo sanu lohri.

Toda!

Tode upar saag.

Saag!

Saag wich mirch!

Mirch!

Mirch lgi kodi.

Kodi!

Deyo sanu lohri.

Similar festivals in other countries
Festivals analogous to Lohri are celebrated in various regions around the world. 

During Christmastide celebrations, Christian parishioners often hold candles during the hymn Silent Night at church services, and at home yule logs are burnt: "as the fire grew brighter and burned hotter, and as the log turned into ashes, it symbolized Christ's final and ultimate triumph over sin."

The festival of Hogmanay is celebrated on New Year's Day. The fire festival of Stonehaven in Scotland is the direct descendant of lighting winter solstice bonfires. Another event is observed every 11 January when the flaming Clavie (a barrel full of staves) is carried round in Burghead and is wedged on the Doorie Hill. When it is burnt out, people take the smouldering embers to bring good luck for the coming year.

See also
 Pongal
 Bhogali Bihu
 Sankranti
 Winter Solstice

Notes

References

Punjabi festivals
January observances
Festivals in Punjab, Pakistan
Punjab
Harvest festivals in India
Winter festivals
Traditions involving fire